Almost There is an EP by American rapper and producer Lucki. It was released on May 29, 2020 under Empire.

The first single to be released, "Faith" was released on April 17, 2020. The second single "Tune and Scotty" was released on May 22, 2020.

Track listing

Charts

References

2020 EPs
Lucki albums